The men's 10,000 metres event featured at the 1991 World Championships in Tokyo, Japan. There were a total number of 40 participating athletes, with two qualifying heats and the final being held on 26 August 1991.

Final

Qualifying heats
Held on Saturday 1991-08-24

See also
 1990 Men's European Championships 10.000 metres (Split)
 1992 Men's Olympic 10.000 metres (Barcelona)
 1993 Men's World Championships 10.000 metres (Stuttgart)

References
 Results

 
10,000 metres at the World Athletics Championships